The 2016 Copa Chile, (officially known as Copa Chile MTS 2016 because of its sponsorship), was the 37th edition of the Copa Chile, the country's national cup tournament. The competition started on 8 July 2016 with the First Round and ended on 14 December 2016 with the Final. Colo-Colo were the winners after beating Everton 4–0 in the final, and qualified for the 2017 Copa Libertadores and the 2017 Supercopa de Chile. As the runners-up, Everton qualified for the 2017 Copa Sudamericana.

Format 
The Copa Chile MTS 2016 was based on a system of direct elimination, similar to the Copa del Rey. In the first round match the 15 teams of Primera B faced against the 16 of the Premier Division (with the exception of Universidad de Chile, defending champions, who entered the competition at the round of 16).

Prizes 
The champion of this edition, earned the right to compete in the 2017 Copa Libertadores as Chile 3 (qualifying for the first round of the continental tournament). Besides, it earned the right to play the Supercopa de Chile 2017, against the best 2016-17 Primera Division champion.

Schedule

First round
The first legs were played on 8–13 July, and the second legs were played on 15–20 July 2016.

|}

Round of 16
The draw for the Round of 16 (and ongoing phases) was held on 22 August 2016. In this round, Universidad de Chile entered the competition as defending champions.

The first legs were played on 15–21 September, and the second legs were played on 21 September–8 October 2016.

The tie between Palestino and Everton was delayed due to the participation of Palestino at the 2016 Copa Sudamericana.

|}

First leg

Second leg

Quarterfinals
The first legs were played on 18–20 October, and the second legs were played on 24–26 October 2016.

The tie between Unión Española and Everton was delayed due to the participation of Palestino at the 2016 Copa Sudamericana.

|}

First leg

Second leg

Semifinals
The first legs will be played on 23 November, and the second legs will be played on 30 November 2016.

|}

First leg

Second leg

Final

Top goalscorers

References

 Official site of the Copa Chile 

Chile
Copa Chile seasons
Copa